Diederik Boer (born 24 September 1980) is a former Dutch footballer who played as a goalkeeper. He spent most of his career playing for PEC Zwolle in the Eredivisie. After retirement in 2019, he is now the goalkeeping coach for the PEC Zwolle youth teams.

Career
Boer was born in Emmeloord, Netherlands. He made his professional debut on 8 March 2003, when FC Zwolle lost to Ajax 5–0. On 31 August 2014, he signed a three-year contract with Ajax to replace the departed Kenneth Vermeer as second keeper behind Jasper Cillessen. Boer is missing the little finger of his right hand, meaning he plays with only 9 fingers.

Honours

Club
PEC Zwolle
Eerste Divisie: 2001–02, 2011–12
KNVB Cup: 2013–14
Johan Cruyff Shield: 2014

Ajax
 UEFA Europa League: runner-up 2016–17

References

External links
 

1980 births
Living people
People from Emmeloord
Footballers from Noordoostpolder
Association football goalkeepers
Dutch footballers
PEC Zwolle players
AFC Ajax players
Eerste Divisie players
Eredivisie players
Flevo Boys players